Victory Theatre or Victory Theater may refer to:

Victory Theater, a theater in Holyoke, Massachusetts
Victory Theatre, a theater in Evansville, Indiana
National Theatre, Melbourne, in Melbourne, Australia, which opened in 1920 as the Victory Theatre 
Victoria Theatre (Dayton, Ohio), which re-opened in 1919 as the Victory Theatre
Victory Theatre, a theatre in Toronto which opened as the Standard Theatre in 1921 and operated as the Victory Theatre (later Victory Burlesque) from 1941 until 1975.

See also
New Victory Theater in New York City, New York